The 6th Guards Tank Brigade was an armoured brigade of the British Army during the Second World War formed from the Foot Guards in 1941 as the 6th Guards Armoured Brigade when the United Kingdom was under the threat of invasion and more armoured formations were required.

History
Permission was granted from King George VI and the Colonels of the Regiments involved and, over the summer of 1941, the Infantry of the Guards converted into an armoured formation and the Guards Armoured Division was formed, containing the 5th and 6th Guards Armoured Brigades, together with supporting units. The 6th Brigade, was converted from the 30th Independent (Guards) Infantry Brigade

In 1942, all British armoured divisions were reorganised to have one armoured brigade and one motorised infantry brigade. The 6th Guards Armoured Brigade thus became an independent tank brigade, being renamed as the 6th Guards Tank Brigade.
The brigade, now equipped with the Churchill tank, served in the North West Europe campaign landing in Normandy on 20 July 1944.

Correspondence in Winston Churchill's The Second World War (Volume V: Closing the Ring, Annex C) in April 1944 appears to indicate there was consideration of breaking the brigade up and making its personnel available as replacements for other army formations. Churchill was opposed to this, and nothing appears to have been done.

The brigade went on to take part in the Battle of Normandy in Operation Bluecoat, Operation Veritable finally ending the war at Lübeck on the Baltic Sea where they captured a U-boat.

Order of battle
The 6th Guards Tank Brigade was constituted as follows during the war:
 4th Tank Battalion Coldstream Guards
 4th Tank Battalion Grenadier Guards
 3rd Tank Battalion Scots Guards

Prior to Operation Plunder & after Operations Veritable & Blackcock, the 6th Guards had units of Artillery, Engineer and other units to their formation. The Brigade then became known as the 6th Guards Armoured Brigade through to V.E day.

Commanders
The following officers commanded 6th Guards Tank Brigade during the war:
 15 January 1943 – 3 August 1944 Brigadier GL Verney
 3 August 1944 – 16 August 1944 Brigadier Sir Walter Bartellot, Bt
 18 August 1944 – 2 February 1945 Brigadier WDC Greenacre

See also

 British armoured formations of World War II
 List of British brigades of the Second World War
 Rhino tank

Notes

References
 The Guards Divisions 1914–45 By Mike Chappell, Published by Osprey Publishing, 1995 . 

 British Armour in the Normandy Campaign 1944 By John Buckley, Published by Routledge, 2004 . 
 6th. Guards Tank Brigade: The Story of Guardsmen in Churchill Tanks by Patrick Forbes, Published by Sampson Low, 1946.

See also
 List of British brigades of the Second World War

External links
 
 
 

Armoured brigades of the British Army in World War II
Military units and formations established in 1941
Guards Division (United Kingdom)
Military units and formations disestablished in 1945